Ng'iya Township is located in the Siaya County of Western Kenya. It is home to the Ng'iya Girls High School.

References 

Siaya County